Eastern Christian School is a private Christian school located on three campuses in Northern New Jersey. Eastern Christian Elementary School (ECES), Eastern Christian Middle School (ECMS), and Eastern Christian High School (ECHS) are all part of Eastern Christian School. Eastern Christian is home to students from middle and northern NJ as well as southern NY. EC also offers a one to four year middle and high school program for F-1 Visa Students. 

Eastern Christian currently has 909 enrolled students and a student–teacher ratio of 11:1. The school's student body is 57% White, 15% Asian, 13% Hispanic or Latino, 8% Black and 7% Multiracial.

Academics 
As the oldest and largest Christian day school in the New York Metropolitan area, Eastern Christian’s commitment to academic excellence is measured by its faculty, facilities, and rigorous curriculum. It is also affiliated with Christian Schools International, which includes 425 school systems in the United States and Canada. The faculty is New Jersey State certified with an average teaching experience of 15 years; almost half having earned advanced degrees.

High School 
Accredited by the Middle States Association of Schools and Colleges and approved by the New Jersey Department of Education, Eastern Christian High School offers a strong college preparatory program and general and business programs for students going immediately to careers. Well qualified instructors teach their subjects from a Christian perspective. Students are constantly challenged to put their faith into action. The “Faith in Action” program is one such project that requires students who enter High School to volunteer time for community service.

Parents and students applying will want to bear in mind that the atmosphere is distinctively and purposely Christian and that the course work is stimulating, challenging and rigorous.

Highlights:

 Four years of pre-college preparation in English, Math, Science and Social Studies
 Project Acceleration partnership with Seton Hall University. Students have access to classes bearing 41 college credits while enrolled in high school.
 Elective courses in Business, Art, Bible, Social Studies, English, and Science
 Outstanding music programs: Concert Band, Orchestra, Choir, and Honors Choir
 Resource Room for students who need individual assistance
 40-minute non-graded learning period (SOAR) 4 days per week for non-traditional learning, remediation, and student leadership opportunities

Middle School 
The Middle School is the bridge between elementary and high school. Here, 4th and 5th grade students continue in an upper elementary model. The upper elementary program is characterized by an integrated Humanities program and Science & Math experience in 4th and 5th grade. Students in 6th, 7th and 8th grade have a departmentalized structure, providing instructors who are teaching in their areas of expertise. At the same time, we recognize the unique needs of rapidly growing middle school students by offering a rich variety of academic and practical learning opportunities during daily “activity periods.” Conscious of the spiritual capacity of middle school students, all subjects are taught from a Christian perspective and help students make ethical decisions.

Highlights

 Daily devotions and weekly chapel/small groups
 Service learning program (Make a Difference Program)
 Upper Elementary Program in Grades 4 and 5 (½ day Humanities, ½ day Math and Science)
 Departmentalized instruction in grades 6-8
 Advanced classes in algebra and geometry
 Resource Room to assist students who need individual help
 Outstanding music program offering Band, Choir and Orchestra with multiple formal and community-based performances and recitals
 State-of-the-art Media Center
 Competitive athletic teams in Soccer, Basketball, Volleyball, Cross Country, and Track
 6th-8th grade 1:1 chromebook policy. Grades 4-5 utilize classroom sets.
 Full integration of the Google Apps for Education into middle school systems for student creation, collaboration and production

Elementary School 
The Eastern Christian Elementary School offers a complete academic education with a spiritual dimension complementing the teaching of both home and church.

Teachers provide an environment where children feel secure, loved and respected. Students are encouraged to develop a love for learning as they develop basic skills for a lifetime of education.

Highlights

 Daily devotions and Bible lessons, weekly chapel services
 90 minutes of daily Language Arts instruction including phonics, reading, writing, spelling and speaking
 60 minutes of daily math instruction
 Cutting edge technology for student use including computers, iPads, Chromebooks and Promethean boards in classrooms
 Comprehensive music program for Preschool-3rd grade
 Weekly specials classes in grades K-3 include Physical Education/Health, Music, Art, Computers and Library
 Before school and after school programs

Extracurricular Activities

High School 
At Eastern Christian High School a diverse athletic program enables students so inclined to develop, enhance and use their God-given physical and mental gifts.

Opportunities are available for both individual and team participation. Athletics offer a unique and effective environment in which to learn some of the Christian life’s most valued lessons. These can include sacrifice, diligence, perseverance, respect, and putting the good of the group ahead of what is good for oneself.

While 60% of students are involved in the athletic program, ECHS also offers a range of other activities to meet student interests. These include fencing, fly fishing, musical production, astronomy, robotics, gardening and more.

ECHS also offers 13 music and art electives, 3 music ensembles and 2 theater productions each year.

Middle School 
The middle school campus offers a variety of fall, winter and spring athletic teams to encourage younger athletes to begin their journey as an Eastern Christian Eagle.

Students find friends and mentors throughout the EC community, including through team sports, Advisory Program, and annual events such as Robot Fight Night, Homecoming, Winter Carnival, and Hands Dirty Day. A variety of after school school clubs give students room to explore their interests and cultivate new skills, including STEAM, coding, lego engineering and baking.

Elementary School 
Elementary School students at  Eastern Christian receive regular special instruction in Music, Library, STEAM, Art and Physical Education. Beginning in second grade, they may opt in to an additional violin program. After school club offerings range from sports to art to dancing and more.

Notable alumni
 Jonas Brothers, Kevin and Joe and Hailey Rhode Baldwin — attended the school.
 Bethany Joy Galeotti (born 1981 as Bethany Joy Lenz), singer/songwriter, actress.
 Jon Egan & Dan Egan, members of the band Desperation Band
 Peter Kreeft (born 1937), philosopher.
 Alexander Noyes (born 1986), drummer for the band Honor Society.
 Katie Sagona (born 1989), actress.
 Antonique Smith, actress/singer best known for her starring role as Mimi in Jonathan Larson's Broadway production of Rent and starred as Faith Evans in the film Notorious.

External links
School website
Data for Eastern Christian High School, National Center for Education Statistics

References

Christian schools in New Jersey
Private high schools in Passaic County, New Jersey
Christian educational institutions
Private high schools in New Jersey
Private middle schools in New Jersey
Private elementary schools in New Jersey